Antonio Vidal may refer to:
Antonio Vidal Caturla (1923-1999), Spanish footballer
Antonio Vidal Fernández (1928-2013), Cuban artist